The Allis-Bushnell House is a historic house at 853 Boston Post Road in Madison, Connecticut. It was built in 1785 and in 1982, was placed into the National Register of Historic Places.  The house is owned by the Madison Historical Society and operated as a historic house museum.

In 1772, the 94.5-acre tract upon which the home stands was sold off to four individuals, which included Nathaniel Allis Sr. The tract was divided, and Allis received a portion including the site of the Allis-Bushnell House. Following more transfers, by 1774 David Landon and Samuel Brown were the owners of the property. Aaron Blatchley brought the land from Brown and Landon in 1785. The house was constructed as a 1-story building. It contained two sizeable rooms at the front with a smaller kitchen and bedroom behind. On the second floor, there were four small rooms. At an unknown point in the house's history, the roof was raised along the front facade to create a full second floor. The Victorian addition was likely added after the Civil War. The property was constructed from April 23, 1785 (upon the four acres being purchased by Blatchley) to December 16, 1789 (when Blatchy sold the "dwelling house").

In 1917, the Madison Historical Society rented the property for its collections and as somewhere to meet. On July 13, 1920, the organization purchased the property as well as 0.56 acres. Until 2010, the house was the Madison Historical Society's headquarters. The house can be accessed by members and the public for special events.

See also
National Register of Historic Places listings in New Haven County, Connecticut

References

Allis-Bushnell House (Madison Historical Society) https://www.madisonhistory.org/allis-bushnell-house/

External links
Madison Historical Society

Houses on the National Register of Historic Places in Connecticut
Houses completed in 1785
Historic house museums in Connecticut
Museums in New Haven County, Connecticut
Madison, Connecticut
Houses in New Haven County, Connecticut
Historical society museums in Connecticut
National Register of Historic Places in New Haven County, Connecticut